Rara is a village in Jalandhar district of Punjab State, India. The village is administrated by a sarpanch, who is an elected representative.

Transport 
Bilga railway station is the nearest train station.

References 

Villages in Jalandhar district